Dewey Everett Robinson (born April 28, 1955) is an American former professional baseball right-handed relief pitcher and current coach, who played in Major League Baseball (MLB) for the Chicago White Sox (1979–81), where he appeared in 30 games.

Robinson spent four seasons as a bullpen coach and pitching coach in the Major leagues for the White Sox and Houston Astros. He currently serves in a coaching capacity for the Pittsburgh Pirates Minor League Baseball (MiLB) organization.

Playing career
A native of Evanston, Illinois, Robinson attended Southern Illinois University Carbondale. In 1975, he played collegiate summer baseball with the Chatham A's of the Cape Cod Baseball League. Robinson was selected by the White Sox in the 19th round (467th overall) of the 1977 Major League Baseball draft. After a sparkling  season as a relief pitcher for the Class A Appleton Foxes — 50 games pitched, a 10–3 win–loss record, with 17 saves, 121 strikeouts and a 1.72 earned run average (ERA), in 89 innings pitched — he made the 1979 ChiSox' opening day roster. But he was ineffective in two trials and 11 games with Chicago that season, losing his only decision and posting an ERA of 6.28. In between those stints, however, Robinson had a good season for the Triple-A Iowa Oaks, winning 13 games in relief.

Following Robinson's success at Iowa with a strong  months to begin , he was recalled to the ChiSox in July and pitched well in middle relief. In 15 games through the end of September, Robinson split two decisions and allowed only 26 hits in 35 innings pitched, with an ERA of 3.09. However, Robinson's last appearance in the big leagues — on October 4 — was a memorable one. Entering the game in the ninth inning at Comiskey Park with the White Sox trailing the Minnesota Twins 12–9, Robinson pitched a scoreless inning. Then, when the White Sox rallied for four runs and a walk-off, 13–12 victory, Robinson was credited with the win.

All told, in 30 MLB games and  innings pitched, Robinson split four decisions, giving up 42 hits and 28 bases on balls, with 35 strikeouts, and a career ERA of 4.05. His MiLB playing career ended, following the  season in the Pittsburgh Pirates' and Milwaukee Brewers' organizations.

Coaching career
Robinson coached collegiately at Northwestern University (1982–83) and the University of Missouri (1984–86).

Robinson spent 10 seasons coaching in the Chicago White Sox farm system. He served two seasons as the White Sox' bullpen coach (1993–1994) and was also the pitching coach at Class A Peninsula of the Carolina League in 1987 and Class A Tampa in 1988. Robinson also served the White Sox as minor league pitching coordinator.

Robinson joined the Astros organization in 1997 and was named the club's "Player Development Man of the Year" in 1998.

Robinson was not retained by the Astros following the 2009 season. That October, he agreed to become a minor league pitching instructor for the Rays. Prior to the 2020 baseball season, Robinson assumed the title of "Director, Pitching Development". Robinson spent 12 years as the director of pitching development for Tampa Bay. On December 28, 2021, Robinson was hired by the Pittsburgh Pirates organization to serve as a special advisor of pitching development, coaching, and player development.

Personal life
Robinson holds a Bachelor of Science degree in finance from Southern Illinois University at Carbondale. He and his wife, Cindy, have two sons, Brett and Greg. Brett pitched for the Astros Short-Season Class A affiliate at Tri-City in 2007 after being drafted in the 27th round in June.

References

External links

Dewey Robinson Rays Coaching Bio

 

1955 births
Living people
American expatriate baseball players in Canada
Appleton Foxes players
Baseball coaches from Illinois
Baseball players from Illinois
Chatham Anglers players
Chicago White Sox coaches
Chicago White Sox players
Edmonton Trappers players
Houston Astros coaches
Iowa Oaks players
Knoxville Sox players
Major League Baseball bullpen coaches
Minor league baseball coaches
Major League Baseball pitchers
Major League Baseball pitching coaches
Portland Beavers players
Southern Illinois Salukis baseball players
Vancouver Canadians players